Zhang Xin (born 1965) is the CEO of SOHO China.

Zhang Xin is also the name of:
 Zhang Xin (footballer) (born 1992),Chinese International footballer
Zhang Xin (writer) (born 1954), Chinese author
Zhang Xin (skier) (born 1985), Chinese freestyle skier
Xin Zhang (engineer), Chinese-born mechanical engineering researcher at Boston University, USA
Zhang Xin (speed skater)
Zhang Xin (skateboarder)

See also
Zhangxin (disambiguation) for places
Zhang Xing (born 1986), Chinese handball player